Martin Joseph Damm Jr. (born 30 September 2003) is an American professional tennis player.

On the junior tour, Damm has a career high junior ranking of 3, achieved on 1 January 2021.

In August 2019, Damm and his partner Toby Kodat won the USTA Boys 18s National Championships doubles title, earning the pair a wild-card entry into the doubles main draw of the 2019 US Open. Damm and fellow American Toby Kodat became the youngest men's doubles team to win a US Open match in the Open Era.

Damm is the son of former tennis player Martin Damm.

ATP Challenger and ITF World Tennis Tour Finals

Singles: 6 (3–3)

Doubles: 7 (5–2)

References

External links

2003 births
Living people
American male tennis players
Czech male tennis players
Sportspeople from Bradenton, Florida
American people of Czech descent
Tennis people from Florida